Faisal bin Bandar bin Abdulaziz Al Saud (born 1945) is a Saudi royal who has served as the governor of Riyadh since 2015.

Early life and education
Prince Faisal was born in 1945. He is the eldest son of Prince Bandar bin Abdulaziz. His mother is Wasmiyah bint Abdul Rahman Al Mu'ammar. Prince Faisal obtained a bachelor of arts degree in history at King Saud University in 1969.

Career
Faisal bin Bandar is a former military officer. In 1970, he served as the director of the organization and administration department of the Ministry of Defense. He began to serve as the director of the training department of the Ministry of Communication in 1974. Then he appointed assistant deputy governor of Asir Province in 1978 which he held until 1981. He was named as deputy governor of the same province in May 1981. He was the governor of Al-Qassim Province from May 1992 to 29 January 2015 when he was named as the governor of Riyadh Province. He replaced Turki bin Abdullah as governor of Riyadh Province. Faisal bin Mishaal Al Saud became the governor of Al Qassim Province on the same date.

On 20 April 2016 he was heading the delegation welcoming USA president Barack Obama to Riyadh.

Alliances
Prince Faisal was considered close to King Abdullah.

Other positions
Faisal bin Bandar is a member of the Allegiance Council since its formation in 2007.

Personal life
Faisal bin Bandar is married to Noura bint Muhammad bin Saud bin Abdul Rahman and has four children: Mohammad, Bandar, Sara and Mishail. His son Mohammad is a military officer and a jet pilot at the Royal Saudi Air Force (RSAF). Another son, Bandar, was appointed assistant chief of General Intelligence in June 2017.

On 8 April 2020 The New York Times reported that Faisal bin Bandar was in intensive care with COVID-19 complications.

References

Faisal
Faisal
1945 births
Governors of Riyadh Province
King Saud University alumni
Living people
Faisal